For the Damned, the Dumb & the Delirious is the sixth studio album by the Boston ska punk band Big D and the Kids Table, released on July 5, 2011 by Side One Dummy Records. The two men pictured on the album cover are Jon Cauztik from the Have Nots and Mark Unseen from The Unseen.

The album is dedicated to Mitchell Dubey, a 23-year-old California-born punk musician and bicycle repairman who was murdered in New Haven, Connecticut in March 2011.

Track listing
All songs written by Big D and the Kids Table unless otherwise noted.
 "Walls"
 "Clothes Off" (Big D and the Kids Table/Brian Klemm)
 "Modern American Gypsy"
 "Best of Them All"
 "Rotten"
 "Brain's-a-Bomb"
 "My Buddy's Back"
 "Stringers"
 "Destination Gone Astray" (Big D and the Kids Table/Sean P. Rogan)
 "Roxbury (Roots n' Shoots)"
 "Home"
 "It's Raining Zombies on Wall Street"
 "Set Me Straight"
 "Not Our Fault"
 "Riot Girl"
 "Good Looking"
 "One Day"
 "As Long as We're Still Cool" (Bonus Track, track 30 on CD)

Personnel
David McWane – Vocals
Sean P. Rogan - Vocals, Guitar, Harmonica
Nick Pantazi – Guitar
Steve Foote – Bass Guitar, Ukulele
Derek Davis – Drums
Ryan O’Connor – Saxophone, Melodica
Chris Lucca – Trumpet
Dan Stoppelman – Trumpet
Paul Cuttler – Trombone
Kyle M. Bagley - Trombone
Gabe Feenberg - Accordion
Anthony Carone - Piano, Organ
Paul Dussault - Baritone Saxophone
Gabe Rossi - Fiddle
Sirae Richardson - Vocals
Haley Jane - Vocals
Brianne Finn - Vocals
Mike McMillen - Engineer
Ray Jeffrey - Engineer
Jim Seigel - Mixing

External links 
 Band Website

References 

2011 albums
SideOneDummy Records albums
Big D and the Kids Table albums